Joseph Fred Hueglin (February 7, 1937 – July 5, 2022) was a Canadian politician who was a Member of Parliament and a founder of the Progressive Canadian Party.

Born in Stratford, Ontario, Hueglin was elected to Parliament in 1972 in the riding of Niagara Falls as a member of the Progressive Conservative Party of Canada (PC). In 1974 Hueglin was defeated by the Liberal candidate.

Within the Progressive Conservative Party, Hueglin was, along with David Orchard, among the most vocal opponents of the 2003 merger of Canada's two prominent right-wing parties, the Progressive Conservatives and the Canadian Alliance, into the Conservative Party of Canada.  He expressed discomfort over the way the merger took place - which involved PC leader Peter MacKay breaking an anti-merger promise he had made while campaigning to be the party leader. Hueglin also expressed discomfort over the "neoconservative" aspects of Alliance policy, which he feared might dominate the policies of the new party.

In 2004, Hueglin became a lead organizer for the Progressive Canadian Party, which he described as a centrist party.

References

External links
 

1937 births
2022 deaths
Members of the House of Commons of Canada from Ontario
Progressive Conservative Party of Canada MPs
People from Stratford, Ontario
Progressive Canadian Party politicians
Canadian political party founders